Rajahmundry Airport  is a domestic airport located at Rajahmundry, Andhra Pradesh, India. It is located on National Highway 516E. During 1985–1994, it was used by Vayudoot. It is heavily used by the helicopters of Oil and Natural Gas Corporation (ONGC) and other government agencies for offshore oil exploration operations.

History 

It was served by Vayudoot between 1985 and 1994 and by VIF Airways in 1995. The Andhra Pradesh government signed an MoU worth  with the Airports Authority of India (AAI) in February 2007 for modernising the airport. The terminal was inaugurated on 16 May 2012.

Limited by the runway length, airlines operate smaller 70 seat turbo-prop aircraft like the ATR-72 and the Q-400. Approximately, 800 acres have been acquired for this expansion. The government is aiming to develop this airport as an international airport.

The airport has seen a rapid increase of passenger footfall during the second half of 2020 – from 7,700 in July to 28,900 in December. The new terminal would be able to handle about 1,400 passengers.

Airlines and destinations

References

External links 

Rajahmundry Airport at the Airports Authority of India

Airports in Andhra Pradesh
Buildings and structures in East Godavari district
Transport in East Godavari district
Buildings and structures in Rajahmundry
Transport in Rajahmundry
Airports with year of establishment missing